40th National Board of Review Awards
January 10, 1969
The 40th National Board of Review Awards were announced on January 10, 1969.

Top Ten Films 
The Shoes of the Fisherman
Romeo and Juliet
Yellow Submarine
Charly
Rachel, Rachel
The Subject Was Roses
The Lion in Winter
Planet of the Apes
Oliver!
2001: A Space Odyssey

Top Foreign Films 
War and Peace
Hagbard and Signe
Hunger
The Two of Us
The Bride Wore Black

Winners 
Best Film: The Shoes of the Fisherman
Best Foreign Film: War and Peace
Best Actor: Cliff Robertson (Charly)
Best Actress: Liv Ullmann (Hour of the Wolf, Shame)
Best Supporting Actor: Leo McKern (The Shoes of the Fisherman)
Best Supporting Actress: Virginia Maskell (Interlude)
Best Director: Franco Zeffirelli (Romeo and Juliet)

External links 
 National Board of Review of Motion Pictures :: Awards for 1968

1968
National Board of Review Awards
National Board of Review Awards
National Board of Review Awards
National Board of Review Awards